Picacho Mountain, also known as El Picacho and Picacho Peak, is a summit in Doña Ana County, New Mexico.

References

Landforms of Doña Ana County, New Mexico
Mountains of New Mexico
Mountains of Doña Ana County, New Mexico